First aid is the first and immediate assistance given to any person with either a minor or serious  illness or injury, with care provided to preserve life, prevent the condition from worsening, or to promote recovery. It includes initial intervention in a serious condition prior to professional medical help being available, such as performing cardiopulmonary resuscitation (CPR) while waiting for an ambulance, as well as the complete treatment of minor conditions, such as applying a plaster to a cut. First aid is generally performed by someone with basic medical training. Mental health first aid is an extension of the concept of first aid to cover mental health, while psychological first aid is used as early treatment of people who are at risk for developing PTSD. Conflict First Aid, focused on preservation and recovery of an individual's social or relationship well-being, is being piloted in Canada.

There are many situations that may require first aid, and many countries have legislation, regulation, or guidance, which specifies a minimum level of first aid provision in certain circumstances. This can include specific training or equipment to be available in the workplace (such as an automated external defibrillator), the provision of specialist first aid cover at public gatherings, or mandatory first aid training within schools. First aid, however, does not necessarily require any particular equipment or prior knowledge, and can involve improvisation with materials available at the time, often by untrained people.

Early history and warfare

Skills of what is now known as first aid have been recorded throughout history, especially in relation to warfare, where the care of both traumatic and medical cases is required in particularly large numbers. The bandaging of battle wounds is shown on Classical Greek pottery from c. 500 BC, whilst the parable of the Good Samaritan includes references to binding or dressing wounds.  There are numerous references to first aid performed within the Roman army, with a system of first aid supported by surgeons, field ambulances, and hospitals.  Roman legions had the specific role of capsarii, who were responsible for first aid such as bandaging, and are the forerunners of the modern combat medic.

Further examples occur through history, still mostly related to battle, with examples such as the Knights Hospitaller in the 11th century AD, providing care to pilgrims and knights in the Holy Land.

Formalization of life saving treatments
During the late 18th century, drowning as a cause of death was a major concern amongst the population. In 1767, a society for the preservation of life from accidents in water was started in Amsterdam, and in 1773, physician William Hawes began publicizing the power of artificial respiration as means of resuscitation of those who appeared drowned. This led to the formation, in 1774, of the Society for the Recovery of Persons Apparently Drowned, later the Royal Humane Society, who did much to promote resuscitation.

Napoleon's surgeon, Baron Dominique-Jean Larrey, is credited with creating an ambulance corps, the ambulance volantes, which included medical assistants, tasked to administer first aid in battle.

In 1859, Swiss businessman Jean-Henri Dunant witnessed the aftermath of the Battle of Solferino, and his work led to the formation of the Red Cross, with a key stated aim of "aid to sick and wounded soldiers in the field". The Red Cross and Red Crescent are still the largest provider of first aid worldwide.

In 1870, Prussian military surgeon Friedrich von Esmarch introduced formalized first aid to the military, and first coined the term "erste hilfe" (translating to 'first aid'), including training for soldiers in the Franco-Prussian War on care for wounded comrades using pre-learnt bandaging and splinting skills, and making use of the Esmarch bandage which he designed. The bandage was issued as standard to the Prussian combatants, and also included aide-memoire pictures showing common uses.

In 1872, the Order of Saint John of Jerusalem in England changed its focus from hospice care, and set out to start a system of practical medical help, starting with making a grant towards the establishment of the UK's first ambulance service. This was followed by creating its own wheeled transport litter in 1875 (the St John Ambulance), and in 1877 established the St John Ambulance Association (the forerunner of modern-day St John Ambulance) "to train men and women for the benefit of the sick and wounded".

Also in the UK, Surgeon-Major Peter Shepherd had seen the advantages of von Esmarch's new teaching of first aid, and introduced an equivalent programme for the British Army, and so being the first user of "first aid for the injured" in English, disseminating information through a series of lectures. Following this, in 1878, Shepherd and Colonel Francis Duncan took advantage of the newly charitable focus of St John, and established the concept of teaching first aid skills to civilians. The first classes were conducted in the hall of the Presbyterian school in Woolwich (near Woolwich barracks where Shepherd was based) using a comprehensive first aid curriculum.

First aid training began to spread through the British Empire through organisations such as St John, often starting, as in the UK, with high risk activities such as ports and railways.

Aims
The primary goal of first aid is to prevent death or serious injury from worsening. The key aims of first aid can be summarized with the acronym of 'the three Ps':

 Preserve life:  The overriding aim of all medical care which includes first aid, is to save lives and minimize the threat of death.  First aid done correctly should help reduce the patient's level of pain and calm them down during the evaluation and treatment process.
 Prevent further harm:  Prevention of further harm includes addressing both external factors, such as moving a patient away from any cause of harm, and applying first aid techniques to prevent worsening of the condition, such as applying pressure to stop a bleed from becoming dangerous.
 Promote recovery:  First aid also involves trying to start the recovery process from the illness or injury, and in some cases might involve completing a treatment, such as in the case of applying a plaster   to a small wound.

It is important to note that first aid is not medical treatment and cannot be compared with what a trained medical professional provides. First aid involves making common sense decisions in the best interest of an injured person.

Setting the priorities
Protocols such as ATLS, BATLS, SAFE-POINT are based on the principle of defining the priorities and the procedure where the correct execution of the individual steps achieves the required objective of saving human life. Basic points of these protocols include:

 Catastrophic bleeding (massive external bleeding)
 Airway (clearing airways)
 Breathing (ensuring respiration)
 Circulation (internal bleeding)
 Disability (neurological condition)
 Exposure (overall examination, environment)

A major benefit of these protocols is that they require minimum resources, time and skills with a great degree of success in saving lives under conditions unfavourable for applying first aid.

ABCDE method 

Airway (clearing airways):   If the patient responds in a normal voice, then the airway is patent. Airway obstruction can be partial or complete. Signs of a partially obstructed airway include a changed voice, noisy breathing (e.g., stridor), and an increased breathing effort. With a completely obstructed airway, there is no respiration despite great effort (i.e., paradox respiration, or "see-saw" sign). A reduced level of consciousness is a common cause of airway obstruction, partial or complete. A common sign of partial airway obstruction in the unconscious state is snoring.  Untreated airway obstruction can rapidly lead to cardiac arrest. All health care professionals, regardless of the setting, can assess the airway as described and use a head-tilt and chin-lift maneuver to open the airway. With the proper equipment, suction of the airways to remove obstructions, for example, blood or vomit, is recommended. If possible, foreign bodies causing airway obstruction should be removed. In the event of a complete airway obstruction, treatment should be given according to current guidelines. In brief, to conscious patients give five back blows alternating with five abdominal thrusts until the obstruction is relieved. If the victim becomes unconscious, call for help and start cardiopulmonary resuscitation according to guidelines. Importantly, high-flow oxygen should be provided to all critically ill persons as soon as possible.
 Breathing (ensuring respiration):   In all settings, it is possible to determine the respiratory rate, inspect movements of the thoracic wall for symmetry and use of auxiliary respiratory muscles, and percuss the chest for unilateral dullness or resonance. Cyanosis, distended neck veins, and lateralization of the trachea can be identified. If a stethoscope is available, lung auscultation should be performed and, if possible, a pulse oximeter should be applied. Tension pneumothorax must be relieved immediately by inserting a cannula where the second intercostal space crosses the midclavicular line (needle thoracocentesis). Bronchospasm should be treated with inhalations.  If breathing is insufficient, assisted ventilation must be performed by giving rescue breaths with or without a barrier device. Trained personnel should use a bag mask if available.
 Circulation (internal bleeding):   The capillary refill time and pulse rate can be assessed in any setting. Inspection of the skin gives clues to circulatory problems. Color changes, sweating, and a decreased level of consciousness are signs of decreased perfusion. If a stethoscope is available, heart auscultation should be performed. Electrocardiography monitoring and blood pressure measurements should also be performed as soon as possible. Hypotension is an important adverse clinical sign. The effects of hypovolemia can be alleviated by placing the patient in the supine position and elevating the patient's legs. An intravenous access should be obtained as soon as possible and saline should be infused.
 Disability (neurological condition):   The level of consciousness can be rapidly assessed using the AVPU method, where the patient is graded as alert (A), voice responsive (V), pain responsive (P), or unresponsive (U). Alternatively, the Glasgow Coma Score can be used.16 Limb movements should be inspected to evaluate potential signs of lateralization. The best immediate treatment for patients with a primary cerebral condition is stabilization of the airway, breathing, and circulation. In particular, when the patient is only pain responsive or unresponsive, airway patency must be ensured, by placing the patient in the recovery position, and summoning personnel qualified to secure the airway. Ultimately, intubation may be required. Pupillary light reflexes should be evaluated and blood glucose measured. A decreased level of consciousness due to low blood glucose can be corrected quickly with oral or infused glucose.
 Exposure (overall examination, environment):  Signs of trauma, bleeding, skin reactions (rashes), needle marks, etc., must be observed. Bearing the dignity of the patient in mind, clothing should be removed to allow a thorough physical examination to be performed. Body temperature can be estimated by feeling the skin or using a thermometer when available.

Key skills

Certain skills are considered essential to the provision of first aid and are taught ubiquitously. Particularly the "ABC"s of first aid, which focus on critical life-saving intervention, must be rendered before treatment of less serious injuries. ABC stands for Airway, Breathing, and Circulation. The same mnemonic is used by emergency health professionals. Attention must first be brought to the airway to ensure it is clear. Obstruction (choking) is a life-threatening emergency. Following evaluation of the airway, a first aid attendant would determine adequacy of breathing and provide rescue breathing if necessary.

Assessment of circulation is now not usually carried out for patients who are not breathing, with first aiders now trained to go straight to chest compressions (and thus providing artificial circulation) but pulse checks may be done on less serious patients.

Some organizations add a fourth step of "D" for Deadly bleeding or Defibrillation, while others consider this as part of the Circulation step simply referred as Disability. Variations on techniques to evaluate and maintain the ABCs depend on the skill level of the first aider.  Once the ABCs are secured, first aiders can begin additional treatments or examination, as required if they possess the proper training (such as measuring pupil dilation). Some organizations teach the same order of priority using the "3Bs": Breathing, Bleeding, and Bones (or "4Bs": Breathing, Bleeding, Burns, and Bones). While the ABCs and 3Bs are taught to be performed sequentially, certain conditions may require the consideration of two steps simultaneously. This includes the provision of both artificial respiration and chest compressions to someone who is not breathing and has no pulse, and the consideration of cervical spine injuries when ensuring an open airway.

Skills applicable to the wider context are reflected in the mnemonic AMEGA, which refers to the tasks of "assess", "make safe", "emergency aid", "get help" and "aftermath". The aftermath tasks include recording and reporting, continued care of patients and the welfare of responders and the replacement of used first aid kit elements.

Preserving life 
The patient must have an open airway—that is, an unobstructed passage that allows air to travel from the open mouth or uncongested nose, down through the pharynx and into the lungs. Conscious people maintain their own airway automatically, but those who are unconscious (with a GCS of less than 8) may be unable to do so, as the part of the brain that manages spontaneous breathing may not be functioning.

Whether conscious or not, the patient may be placed in the recovery position, laying on their side. In addition to relaxing the patient, this can have the effect of clearing the tongue from the pharynx. It also avoids a common cause of death in unconscious patients, which is choking on regurgitated stomach contents.

The airway can also become blocked by a foreign object. To dislodge the object and prevent choking, the first aider may use techniques such as 'back slaps' and 'abdominal thrusts'.

Once the airway has been opened, the first aider would reassess the patient's breathing. If there is no breathing, or the patient is not breathing normally (e.g. agonal breathing), the first aider would initiate CPR, which attempts to restart the patient's breathing by forcing air into the lungs. They may also manually massage the heart to promote blood flow around the body.

If the choking person is an infant, the procedure is to deliver five strong blows on the infant's upper back after placing the infant's face in the aider's forearm. If the infant is able to cough or cry, no breathing assistance should be given. Coughing and crying indicate the airway is open and the foreign object will likely to come out from the force the coughing or crying produces.

A first responder should know how to use an Automatic External Defibrillator (AED) in the case of a person having a sudden cardiac arrest. The survival rate of those who have a cardiac arrest outside of the hospital is low. Permanent brain damage sets in after 5 minutes of no oxygen delivery, so rapid action on the part of the rescuer is necessary. An AED is a device that can examine a heartbeat and produce electric shocks to restart the heart.

A first aider should be prepared to quickly deal with less severe problems such as cuts, grazes or bone fracture. They may be able to completely resolve a situation if they have the proper training and equipment. For situations that are more severe, complex or dangerous, a first aider might need to do the best they can with the equipment they have, and wait for an ambulance to arrive at the scene.

Training Principles

Basic principles, such as knowing the use of adhesive bandage or applying direct pressure on a bleed, are often acquired passively through life experiences. However, to provide effective, life-saving first aid interventions requires instruction and practical training. This is especially true where it relates to potentially fatal illnesses and injuries, such as those that require CPR; these procedures may be invasive, and carry a risk of further injury to the patient and the provider. As with any training, it is more useful if it occurs before an actual emergency, and in many countries, emergency ambulance dispatchers may give basic first aid instructions over the phone while the ambulance is on the way.

Training is generally provided by attending a course, typically leading to certification. Due to regular changes in procedures and protocols, based on updated clinical knowledge, and to maintain skill, attendance at regular refresher courses or re-certification is often necessary. First aid training is often available through community organizations such as the Red Cross and St. John Ambulance, or through commercial providers, who will train people for a fee. This commercial training is most common for training of employees to perform first aid in their workplace. Many community organizations also provide a commercial service, which complements their community programmes.

1.Junior level certificate Basic Life Support

2.Senior level certificate

3.Special certificate

Types of first aid which require training

There are several types of first aid (and first aider) that require specific additional training. These are usually undertaken to fulfill the demands of the work or activity undertaken.
 Aquatic/Marine first aid is usually practiced by professionals such as lifeguards, professional mariners or in diver rescue, and covers the specific problems which may be faced after water-based rescue or delayed MedEvac.
 Battlefield first aid takes into account the specific needs of treating wounded combatants and non-combatants during armed conflict.
 Conflict First Aid focuses on support for stability and recovery of personal, social, group or system well-being and to address circumstantial safety needs. 

 Hyperbaric first aid may be practiced by underwater diving professionals, who need to treat conditions such as decompression sickness.
Oxygen first aid is the providing of oxygen to casualties with conditions resulting in hypoxia. It is also a standard first aid procedure for underwater diving incidents where gas bubble formation in the tissues is possible.
Wilderness first aid is the provision of first aid under conditions where the arrival of emergency responders or the evacuation of an injured person may be delayed due to constraints of terrain, weather, and available persons or equipment. It may be necessary to care for an injured person for several hours or days.
Mental health first aid is taught independently of physical first aid. How to support someone experiencing a mental health problem or in a crisis situation. Also how to identify the first signs of someone developing mental ill health and guide people towards appropriate help.

First aid services

Some people undertake specific training in order to provide first aid at public or private events, during filming, or other places where people gather.  They may be designated as a first aider, or use some other title.  This role may be undertaken on a voluntary basis, with organisations such as the Red Cross society and St. John Ambulance, or as paid employment with a medical contractor.

People performing a first aid role, whether in a professional or voluntary capacity, are often expected to have a high level of first aid training and are often uniformed.

Symbols

Although commonly associated with first aid, the symbol of a red cross is an official protective symbol of the Red Cross. According to the Geneva Conventions and other international laws, the use of this and similar symbols is reserved for official agencies of the International Red Cross and Red Crescent, and as a protective emblem for medical personnel and facilities in combat situations. Use by any other person or organization is illegal, and may lead to prosecution.

The internationally accepted symbol for first aid is the white cross on a green background shown below.

Some organizations may make use of the Star of Life, although this is usually reserved for use by ambulance services, or may use symbols such as the Maltese Cross, like the Order of Malta Ambulance Corps and St John Ambulance. Other symbols may also be used.

Physical conditions that often require first aid

 Altitude sickness, which can begin in susceptible people at altitudes as low as 5,000 feet, can cause potentially fatal swelling of the brain or lungs.
 Anaphylaxis, a life-threatening condition in which the airway can become constricted and the patient may go into shock. The reaction can be caused by a systemic allergic reaction to allergens such as insect bites or peanuts. Anaphylaxis is initially treated with injection of epinephrine.
 Battlefield first aid—This protocol refers to treating shrapnel, gunshot wounds, burns and bone fractures as seen either in the traditional battlefield setting or in an area subject to damage by large-scale weaponry, such as a bomb blast.
 Bone fracture, a break in a bone initially treated by stabilizing the fracture with a splint.
 Burns, which can result in damage to tissues and loss of body fluids through the burn site.
 Cardiac Arrest, which will lead to death unless CPR preferably combined with an AED is started within minutes. There is often no time to wait for the emergency services to arrive as 92 percent of people suffering a sudden cardiac arrest die before reaching hospital according to the American Heart Association.
 Choking, blockage of the airway which can quickly result in death due to lack of oxygen if the patient's trachea is not cleared, for example by the Heimlich Maneuver.
 Childbirth.
 Cramps in muscles due to lactic acid build up caused either by inadequate oxygenation of muscle or lack of water or salt.
 Diving disorders, drowning or asphyxiation.
 Dysmenorrhea and testicular torsion.
 Heart attack, or inadequate blood flow to the blood vessels supplying the heart muscle.
 Heat stroke, also known as sunstroke or hyperthermia, which tends to occur during heavy exercise in high humidity, or with inadequate water, though it may occur spontaneously in some chronically ill persons. Sunstroke, especially when the patient has been unconscious, often causes major damage to body systems such as brain, kidney, liver, gastric tract. Unconsciousness for more than two hours usually leads to permanent disability. Emergency treatment involves rapid cooling of the patient.
 Hair tourniquet a condition where a hair or other thread becomes tied around a toe or finger tightly enough to cut off blood flow.
 Heat syncope, another stage in the same process as heat stroke, occurs under similar conditions as heat stroke and is not distinguished from the latter by some authorities.
 Heavy bleeding, treated by applying pressure (manually and later with a pressure bandage) to the wound site and elevating the limb if possible.
 Hyperglycemia (diabetic coma) and Hypoglycemia (insulin shock).
 Hypothermia, or Exposure, occurs when a person's core body temperature falls below 33.7 °C (92.6 °F). First aid for a mildly hypothermic patient includes rewarming, which can be achieved by wrapping the affected person in a blanket, and providing warm drinks, such as soup, and high energy food, such as chocolate. However, rewarming a severely hypothermic person could result in a fatal arrhythmia, an irregular heart rhythm.
 Insect and animal bites and stings.
 Joint dislocation.
 Poisoning, which can occur by injection, inhalation, absorption, or ingestion.
 Seizures, or a malfunction in the electrical activity in the brain. Three types of seizures include a grand mal (which usually features convulsions as well as temporary respiratory abnormalities, change in skin complexion, etc.) and petit mal (which usually features twitching, rapid blinking, or fidgeting as well as altered consciousness and temporary respiratory abnormalities).
 Muscle strains and Sprains, a temporary dislocation of a joint that immediately reduces automatically but may result in ligament damage.
 Stroke, a temporary loss of blood supply to the brain.
Shock and electric shock - electrical injury
 Toothache, which can result in severe pain and loss of the tooth but is rarely life-threatening, unless over time the infection spreads into the bone of the jaw and starts osteomyelitis.
 Wounds and bleeding, including lacerations, incisions and abrasions,
Gastrointestinal bleeding, avulsions and Sucking chest wounds, treated with an occlusive dressing to let air out but not in.

Many accidents can happen in homes, offices, schools and laboratories which require immediate attention before the patient is attended by the doctor.

First aid kits
A first aid kit consists of a strong, durable bag or transparent plastic box. They are commonly identified with a white cross on a green background. A first aid kit does not have to be bought ready-made. The advantage of ready-made first aid kits are that they have well organized compartments and familiar layouts.

Contents
There is no universal agreement upon the list for the contents of a first aid kit. The UK Health and Safety Executive stress that the contents of workplace first aid kits will vary according to the nature of the work activities. As an example of possible contents of a kit, British Standard BS 8599 First Aid Kits for the Workplace lists the following items:

Information leaflet
Medium sterile dressings
Large sterile dressings
Bandages
Triangular dressings
Safety pins
Adhesive dressings
Sterile wet wipes
Microporous tape
Nitrile gloves
Face shield
Foil blanket
Burn dressings
Clothing shears
Conforming bandages
Finger dressing
Antiseptic cream
Scissors
Tweezers
Cotton

References

External links

 First Aid Guide at the Mayo Clinic
 First aid from the British Red Cross – including first aid tips and first aid training information
 First aid from St John Ambulance – first aid information and advice

 
Emergency medical services
Lifesaving
Scoutcraft
Self-care